Maduvvaree (Dhivehi: މަޑުއްވަރީ) or Maduvvari is one of the inhabited islands of Meemu Atoll.

Geography

Demography

Healthcare
Maduvvari has a pharmacy.

Utilities
There is an  generator to provide electricity for the island.

References

Islands of the Maldives